The Ukrainian Hockey Championship (tr: Chempionat Ukrayiny z Khokeyu) is an annual ice hockey award and national title, bestowed to the ice hockey organization judged to have the best performing team in Ukraine, founded in 1992. Prior to the 2015–16 season, the league playing for the title took the name Ukrainian Hockey Extra League. In 2016, the new Ukrainian Hockey League was created instead, which folded in 2021.

History
First Ukrainian hockey competitions were conducting since February 1949.

Prior to the formation of the Professional Hockey League (PHL), the Ice Hockey Federation of Ukraine (FHU) administered and handed out the award, allowing both amateur and professional teams to compete in an annual regular season, then playoff for the title. On July 25, 2011, the FHU transferred the rights of the event to the PHL. 

In 2011–12, the championship was awarded in the PHL following a 4-team playoff at the end of the 41-game regular season. The finals were determined though a best-of-seven playoff. Teams that miss the finals participate in a best-of-five playoff to determine final positioning. In addition to the title, the winning team was given a cash prize by the league, US$1,000,000, shared by all of the players.
National finalists receive silver and bronze medals.

Teams

Former teams

 ATEK Kyiv
 Berkut
 Berkut-Kyiv
 Dniprovski Volky Dnipropetrovsk
 Dnipro Kherson
 Donbass-2
 Druzhba-78
 Ekspres Lviv
 Generals Kyiv
 Halytsky Levy
 Jupiter
 Kharkiv
 Kharkivski Akuly
 Kryvbas
 Kryzynka Kyiv
 Kryzhynka-Kompanion
 Legion Simferopol
 Lutsk
 NORD
 Odessa
 Olimpiya Kalush
 OUFK Kharkiv
 Patriot Vinnytsia
 Politekhnik Kyiv
 Rapid
 Salamandra Kharkiv
 SDYuShOR Sokil-89 Kyiv
 SDYuShOR Sokil-90 Kyiv
 SDYuSShOR-Misto Kharkiv
 ShVSM Kyiv
 Sokil Kyiv
 Vatra Ivano-Frankivsk
 VIM-Berkut
 Vinnytski Haidamaky
 Vityaz Kharkiv
 Vorony Sumy
 Yavir Yavoriv
 Yunist Kharkiv

Winners by season

 1992–93: Sokil Kyiv
 1993–94: ShVSM Kyiv
 1994–95: Sokil Kyiv
 1995–96: not contested
 1996–97: Sokil Kyiv
 1997–98: Sokil Kyiv
 1998–99: Sokil Kyiv
 1999–2000: HC Berkut-Kyiv
 2000–01: HC Berkut-Kyiv
 2001–02: HC Berkut-Kyiv
 2002–03: Sokil Kyiv
 2003–04: Sokil Kyiv
 2004–05: Sokil Kyiv
 2005–06: Sokil Kyiv
 2006–07: ATEK Kyiv
 2007–08: Sokil Kyiv
 2008–09: Sokil Kyiv
 2009–10: Sokil Kyiv
 2010–11: HC Donbass
 2011–12: HC Donbass-2
 2012–13: HC Donbass-2
 2013–14: HC Kompanion-Naftogaz
 2014–15: ATEK Kyiv
 2015–16: HC Donbass
 2016–17: HC Donbass
 2017–18: HC Donbass
 2018–19: HC Donbass
 2019–20: HC Kremenchuk 
 2020–21: HC Donbass
 2021–22: no winner
 2022–23: TBD

Statistics by club

Awards

Ukraine Player of the Year
 2002: Vasyl Bobrovnikov
 2003: Borys Protsenko
 2004: Ruslan Fedotenko
 2005: Kostiantyn Simchuk
 2006: Serhiy Klymentiev
 2007: Vyacheslav Zavalnyuk
 2009: Ruslan Fedotenko
 2010: Kostiantyn Kasianchuk
 2011: Oleksandr Materukhin
 2012: Ruslan Fedotenko
 2013: Kostiantyn Kasianchuk

See also
 Professional Hockey League
 Ice Hockey Federation of Ukraine
 2012 Professional Hockey League All-Star Game

References

External links 
 Ice Hockey Federation of Ukraine 
 
 Hockey Championships of UkrSSR in 1949 and 1950 (Чемпіонати УРСР з хокею. 1949, 1950 роки.) Tribuna. 22 July 2013

Championship
1992 establishments in Ukraine
Sports leagues established in 1992
Ice hockey